Modern Pressure is the eighth studio album by Canadian singer-songwriter Daniel Romano. It was released on May 19, 2017 through New West Records.

Track listing

Charts

References

2017 albums
New West Records albums
Daniel Romano albums